I Shot Jesse James is a 1949 American Western film starring Reed Hadley as Jesse James and John Ireland as Bob Ford. Directed by Samuel Fuller in his debut behind the camera, it portrays the murder of Jesse James by Robert Ford and Robert Ford's life afterwards. The story is built around a fictional rivalry between Ford and his eventual killer Edward Kelley (called John in the film) over a woman.

Plot
Bob Ford of the Jesse James gang is wounded during a bank robbery. He mends at Jesse's home in Missouri for six months, although Jesse's wife Zee doesn't trust him.

Cynthy Waters, an actress Bob is in love with, comes to town to perform on stage. Bob catches her speaking with John Kelley, a prospector, and is jealous. He knows that Cynthy wants to get married and settle down.

In need of money, Bob hears of the governor's $10,000 reward for Jesse. He betrays his friend, shooting Jesse in the back. Bob is pardoned by the governor but receives a reward for just $500.

He spends the money on an engagement ring. Harry Kane, who manages Cynthy's career, books Bob for stage appearances in which he re-enacts the shooting of Jesse. He is booed by audiences and mocked in public for his cowardly deed.

Bob goes to Colorado to try prospecting and runs into Kelley, who is rejecting offers to become Creede's town marshal. Bob wakes up one day to find both Kelley and the engagement ring missing. Cynthy arrives just as Kelley returns, having captured the ring's thief. Kelley is disappointed when Cynthy accepts Bob's proposal, so he accepts the job as marshal.

Frank James, brother of Jesse, overhears a conversation in which Cynthy confides to Kelley that he's the one she truly loves. Frank makes sure that Bob learns of this, knowing Bob will make the fatal mistake of confronting Kelley face to face. In the street, Bob draws on Kelley and is shot dead. Kelley gets the girl and Frank avenges his brother's death.

Cast
Preston Foster as John Kelley
Barbara Britton as Cynthy Waters
John Ireland as Bob Ford
Reed Hadley as Jesse James
J. Edward Bromberg as Harry Kane
Victor Kilian as Soapy
Tom Tyler as Frank James
Tommy Noonan as Charles Ford 
Eddie Dunn as Joe, Silver King Bartender
Margia Dean as Saloon Singer
Byron Foulger as Silver King Room Clerk
Jeni Le Gon as Veronica, Cynthy's Maid
Barbara Woodell as Mrs. Zee James
Phillip Pine as Man in Saloon 
Robin Short as Troubadour
Fred Aldrich as Townsman (uncredited)

Production
Sam Fuller was a writer who wanted to direct. He offered Robert L. Lippert a script for a low price if he could direct as well. Fuller's directing fee was a reported $5,000.

Filming started 25 October 1948.

Release
The film premiered in St Joseph, where Bob Ford shot Jesse James.

The film was released on video by the Criterion Collection's Eclipse imprint together with The Baron of Arizona and The Steel Helmet.

Reception
Robert L. Lippert sold the film's international rights for a flat $200,000.

The film reportedly earned Lippert over half a million dollars in profits and was the movie that took his career to the next level in Hollywood.

Lippert was so pleased with the film he signed Carl Hittleman to produce five more films: Grand Canyon, Park Row, The Baron of Arizona, an adaptation of 20,000 Leagues Under the Sea and The Ghost of Jesse James; Park Row, Baron and Leagues were to be directed by Sam Fuller. Fuller did make Baron for Lippert but did Park Row for another producer. Ghost of Jesse James became The Return of Jesse James. Hitleman eventually signed a contract with Universal.

References

External links
 
 I Shot Jesse James on Criterion Collection
 Eclipse Series 5: The First Films of Samuel Fuller on Criterion

1949 films
Biographical films about Jesse James
Films directed by Samuel Fuller
James–Younger Gang
1949 Western (genre) films
American Western (genre) films
Lippert Pictures films
Films scored by Albert Glasser
Revisionist Western (genre) films
1949 directorial debut films
American black-and-white films
1940s English-language films
1940s American films